Oracle Service Bus (abbreviated OSB) is an enterprise service bus used by Oracle Corporation. Formerly named AquaLogic Service Bus, Oracle acquired this technology when it bought BEA Systems.

External links  
 Product page: 

Oracle software
Enterprise application integration